Peterborough United Football Club is an English professional football club based in Peterborough, Cambridgeshire, England. The team compete in League One, the third tier of the English football league system. Peterborough have a long-standing rivalry with nearby club Cambridge United, with whom they contest the Cambridgeshire derby. They have spent their entire history at London Road and are nicknamed "The Posh".

Peterborough United formed in 1934 and joined the Midland League. Having won the Midland League title for five consecutive seasons from 1955-56, they were elected into the Football League in 1960. Peterborough immediately won the Fourth Division title in 1960–61, scoring a Football League record 134 goals. Relegated in 1968, they won another Fourth Division title in 1973–74, though suffered a further relegation in 1979. Peterborough were promoted back into the Third Division at the end of the 1990–91 season and reached the second tier with victory in the 1992 play-off final. However they returned to the fourth tier with relegations in 1994 and 1997.

Peterborough won the Third Division play-offs in 2000 under the stewardship of Barry Fry, though were relegated in 2005. They secured a place in the Championship after manager Darren Ferguson led them to consecutive promotions in 2007–08 and 2008–09 and spent three of the next four seasons in the second tier, winning a play-off final in 2011 after relegation the previous year. They were relegated back into League One in 2013, though went on to win the Football League Trophy in 2014.  In the 2020–21 season, Peterborough were promoted back to the Championship, though were relegated back into League One the following season.

History

1934–1990
Peterborough United formed in 1934 at Peterborough's Angel Hotel to provide a replacement for Peterborough & Fletton United, who had folded two years previously. Peterborough's application to join the Midland League was welcomed by the league, however, the representatives from the club did not have the money to pay for the security deposit, entry fee and subscription. Grantham Town loaned the money to The Posh who began selling shares to raise funds.

4,033 fans attended The Posh's first league match which ended in a 4–0 victory over Gainsborough Trinity. William Rigby scored the team's first goal. They won the Midland League on six occasions, including five seasons in a row from 1956 to 1960. The Posh were elected to The Football League for the beginning of the 1960–61 season, winning Division Four.

Following the Fourth Division Championship success in 1960–61, The Posh spent seven seasons in the 3rd Division. They reached the quarter-finals of the 1964–65 FA Cup, beating Arsenal and Swansea Town along the way before going out to Chelsea. They were relegated back to the 4th Division for financial irregularities in the summer of 1968. The club took six seasons to return to Division 3, winning the 4th Division championship.

In 1977–78 the club threatened to go one better until they narrowly missed out on promotion to Division 2 when they drew the last game of the season at champions Wrexham (0–0) when a win was needed to go up. The game was notable for the fact that over 2,000 Preston North End fans travelled to Wrexham to watch the game and cheer on the home side – Preston were the club who went up because Peterborough did not win. The Wrexham defeat cast a long shadow over the club and it fell into a long decline. Relegation followed in 1979 and Posh subsequently spent 12 years back in the 4th division. The 1980s was a long story of mismanagement and false dawns, punctuated by the odd cup run. March 1984 marked the arrival of striker Errington Kelly on loan; after scoring seven goals in eleven appearances, he was made permanent, and went on to have over 100 appearances for Peterborough over five seasons.

1991–2000
In January 1991, Chris Turner, who had played in the 1974 Fourth division championship team took over as manager and the team embarked on a run of 13 unbeaten games that propelled them into the top four. Six players were signed on transfer deadline day, which at the time was a record for the number of players signed by one club on a single day. On the final day of the season, Posh travelled to Chesterfield needing a win to seal promotion. Despite going two goals down in the first ten minutes, the team rallied and drew level with goals from David Robinson and George Berry. However, Posh's closest rivals, Blackpool lost at Walsall and promotion was achieved.

The following season arguably remains the most successful in the club's history. After an inconsistent start the team hit form during the autumn when they knocked Wimbledon and Newcastle United out of the League Cup. The reward was a home tie with a Liverpool team containing Bruce Grobbelaar, Jan Mølby, Steve McManaman, Dean Saunders and Mark Wright. Garry Kimble scored the only goal after 19 minutes prompting wild celebrations and a place in the quarter-finals. In the league, the team went from strength to strength and surged up the table. Middlesbrough ended the League Cup run after a replay and there was further disappointment when the team missed out on a trip to Wembley in the Football League Trophy when they lost to Stoke City over two legs in the area final.

Progress continued in the league and a play-off place was clinched on the last day of the season despite a 1–0 defeat to champions Brentford. The following week, Huddersfield Town came to London Road for the first leg of the Semi-final. Captain Mick Halsall's last minute equaliser levelled the score at 2–2. Three days later, the supporters travelled north more in hope than expectation but they were rewarded when the team came from a goal down to win 2–1 with Worrell Sterling and Steve Cooper scoring the goals. On 24 May 1992, Peterborough United played at Wembley for the first time, against Stockport County in the Third Division playoff final. With Posh winning 2–1 and gaining promotion to the new First division.  They played in Football League Division One between 1992 and 1994 and finished 10th, their highest ever league finish, in 1992–93 season.

2001–2010
During the 2005–06 season the club had three managers: Team owner Barry Fry returned to management following former England international Mark Wright's sacking in January 2006. Wright's assistant Steve Bleasdale was then appointed acting manager, but resigned in April. Keith Alexander joined as manager from Lincoln City for 2006–07 but was sacked in January 2007 after a run of poor form and was replaced by Darren Ferguson. He led the club to back-to-back promotions from League Two to the Championship in his two full seasons in charge. By November 2009 Posh were bottom of the Championship and Ferguson left the club, to be replaced by Mark Cooper. In February 2010, after only 13 games in charge, Cooper also left the club and Jim Gannon was appointed in his place. Following confirmation of relegation from the Championship after a 2–2 draw at Barnsley, Gannon was replaced by Gary Johnson.

2011–present

Gary Johnson left the club on 10 January 2011 due to policy disagreement. Two days after Johnson's departure, Darren Ferguson returned to the club on a four and a half-year contract. Peterborough finally finished 4th in 2010-11 Football League One with one of the worst defensive records in the third tier, conceding 75 goals, but scoring 106; the most for anybody in the Football League that season. Peterborough beat Milton Keynes Dons in the playoff semi-finals. They defeated Huddersfield Town in the final with a 3–0 victory, and gained promotion back to the Championship.

Darren Ferguson led the team to safety in its first season back in the Championship, leading to a finish in 18th. However, the Posh were relegated back the following season, after losing to Crystal Palace 3–2 on 4 May 2013, the final match of the season.

On 30 March 2014 The Posh won the Football League Trophy after defeating Chesterfield in the final at Wembley Stadium.

Darren Ferguson ended his time as Peterborough United manager on 21 February 2015, following a 3–0 defeat at Milton Keynes Dons.

On 1 May 2021 Peterborough were promoted back to the Championship after an 8-year stay in League One after coming back from 3–0 down to draw 3–3 against rivals Lincoln City following a stoppage time penalty by Jonson Clarke-Harris.

On the 20th February 2022, Darren Ferguson left Peterborough United for the third time, after offering his resignation to club co-owner Darragh Macanthony. Ferguson left the club in the relegation zone of the Sky Bet Championship, five points from safety. Matthew Etherington was placed in temporary charge of the club's upcoming games on Tuesday 22 February. It was announced that his former Posh and Tottenham Hotspur teammate Simon Davies would be assisting him.

On 23 April 2022, Peterborough were relegated back to the EFL League One following a 1-0 defeat at home against Nottingham Forest. During the 2022-23 League One Season, Peterborough were for the first time in over 20 years sharing a division with local rivals in Cambridge United, with the home fixture ending with a 1-0 win for Peterborough.

Colours and kits

Kit manufacturers and sponsors 
Darren Ferguson

Nickname
Peterborough United are nicknamed "The Posh", a moniker coined in 1921, after Pat Tirrell, manager of Fletton United, was reported to say he was "Looking for posh players for a posh new team". When Fletton United looked to join the Southern League in 1923 they added Peterborough to their name to form Peterborough & Fletton United, in an attempt to gain the backing of businesses in Peterborough. Peterborough & Fletton United went bankrupt in October 1932 so the current club is the third to be known as The Posh. However, the term "posh" was used as a derogatory term for the club by the press.

Peterborough & Fletton United were also commonly called "the brickies" in reference to the large brick industry in Peterborough, however the nickname was dropped when the club went bankrupt.

In 2002 Victoria Beckham filed a counter-claim with the UK Patent Office over the club's application to register their nickname of "Posh" for use on merchandise. The former Spice Girl, who was known in the group as "Posh Spice", claimed the "nickname 'Posh' has become synonymous with her on a worldwide basis". She was unsuccessful in her suit.

Stadium
Since their formation Peterborough United have played their home games at London Road. The stand behind the London Road End is terraced while the Moy's End, is a rebuilt all-seater stand, and now known as the DESKGO Stand. A 20,000 all-seater stadium to replace London Road has been proposed.
The record attendance at the stadium is 30,096, achieved on 20 February 1965 in an FA Cup fifth-round game against Swansea Town.

The ground was renamed as the ABAX Stadium in November 2014 as part of a five-year sponsorship deal with Norwegian company ABAX. The first game at the renamed ground was against Bristol City, which City won 3–0. In June 2019, the ground was renamed the "Weston Homes Stadium" as a ten-year sponsorship deal, the largest in the club's history, between the football club and the British property developer company.

Rivals

Cambridge United

According to the Football Fans Census, Cambridge United were considered to be the club's main rival. The Cambridge rivalry has been fought very evenly over the years; Peterborough winning 17 and Cambridge 15, with Peterborough netting 54
times and Cambridge 52 in the 38 competitive matches they have played each other. However, the two sides did not meet each other between 2001 and 2017 when they faced each other in the Checkatrade Trophy, a game which Peterborough won 2–0. They next met in the league on 29 October 2022. A game which Peterborough won 1–0.

Northampton Town

Northampton Town are the club's traditional rival, dating back to when both sides were lower league, and as the city of Peterborough is historically part of Northamptonshire.

MK Dons

More recently, Peterborough fans have begun to view the MK Dons as rivals, partly due to the geographic location, but also due to battling with the MK Dons for promotion from League Two and League One in Darren Ferguson's first two full seasons.

Huddersfield Town

Ever since 1992 there has also been animosity between Peterborough United and Huddersfield Town, with Chris Turner's Peterborough progressing to the final and later on winning the playoffs in the 1991-92 Football League Third Division, they progressed past Huddersfield winning 4–3 on aggregate in the playoff semi finals. This rivalry further grew in 2011 with Peterborough winning against Huddersfield in the 2010–11 League One Playoff Final 3–0, and in the 2012–13 Championship season Huddersfield relegated Peterborough from the championship on the last day of the season with them drawing 2–2 with Barnsley, and with Peterborough losing 3–2 against Crystal Palace, Huddersfield's draw with Barnsley, with both sides willing to see the game out as a draw, caused the latter to leapfrog Peterborough and send them down to League One. This rivalry is set to be played again in the 2021-22 Championship season.

Lincoln City

Peterborough also have shown a certain enmity towards Lincoln City. This rivalry grew as on 1 May 2021, Peterborough United came back from 3-0 down to draw 3-3 meaning they secured automatic promotion to the Championship, denying Lincoln a chance at 2nd and forcing the Lincolnshire club to settle for a play-off place.

Pride of Anglia

Many fans consider Peterborough to be a part of the Pride of Anglia derby, contested between the professional clubs based in Cambridgeshire, Norfolk, Suffolk and sometimes Essex. Matches against these teams often draw large crowds with Posh's highest home attendance of the 2019-20 season coming against Ipswich Town with 10,071 fans. For the return fixture, Peterborough sold out their initial 1,900 ticket allocation.

Players

Current squad

Out on loan

Notable former players
For a list of notable Peterborough United players in sortable-table format see List of Peterborough United F.C. players.

Club officials

Boardroom
 Chairman: Darragh MacAnthony
 Interim Chief Executive Officer: Leighton Mitchell
 Director of Football: Barry Fry
 Directors: Randy Stewart Thompson, Dr Jason Neale & Leighton Mitchell

First Team
 First-team manager: Darren Ferguson 
 Assistant manager: Kieran Scarff 
 First-team coach : Dale Tonge
 Goalkeeping coach: Mark Tyler
 Head of sports science: Lewis Keeble
 First Team Analyst: Matthew Loades
 Physio: Jonathan Chatfield
 Kit Manager: Christian Sansam
 Club doctor: Dr Cosmas C.P Nnochiri

Youth Team
 Interim Under 23s Manager: Ryan Semple
 Interim Under 23s Assistant Manager: Danny Walker
 Under 18s Manager: Jamal Campbell-Ryce
 Youth Lead Phase Coach: Ryan Semple
 Head of academy coaching: Tony Cook
 Head of Player Care: Michael Harriman
 Academy manager: Kieran Scarff

Managers
As of 18 March 2023. Only competitive matches are counted. Periods as caretaker manager are shown in italics

Honours

Football League 3rd Tier (Currently Football League One):
Runners up: 2008–09, 2020–21
Play-off Winners: 1991–92, 2010–11
Football League 4th Tier (Currently Football League Two):
Winners: 1960–61, 1973–74
Runners-up: 1990–91, 2007–08
Play-off Winners: 1999–2000
 Midland League
Winners: 1939–40, 1955–56, 1956–57, 1957–58, 1958–59, 1959–60
Runners up: 1953–54
 FA Cup
Best result: Quarter Final – 1964–65
 Football League Cup
Best result: Semi-final – 1965–66
 Football League Trophy
Winners : 2013–14

Records

Individual records
Most League Appearances:
Tommy Robson – 482 (440 starts and 42 as a substitute): 1968–1981

Most Consecutive Appearances:
Eric Steele – 148 (124 League, 24 Cup): 1973–1977

Most League Goals:
Jim Hall – 122 1967–75

Most League Goals (incl. Non-League):
Dennis Emery—195: 1954-1963

Most League goals in one season:
Terry Bly – 52 : 1960–1961 (also an all-time Fourth Division record)

Record transfers
Highest Transfer Fee Received- a fee around £7m (rising to £10m) from Brentford for Ivan Toney, August 2020

Highest Transfer Fee Paid – A fee exceeding £1.25m to Bristol City for Mo Eisa, June 2019

References

External links

Official Forum
Largest Supporter Forum
Every match result and League table since they joined the Football League

UpThePosh! The Peterborough United Database
Un-Official Posh Fans Podcast
Peterborough United Supporters FC (PUSFC)
Vital Posh – By the fans, for the fans!

 
English Football League clubs
EFL Championship clubs
Association football clubs established in 1934
1934 establishments in England
Football clubs in Cambridgeshire
Football clubs in England
EFL Trophy winners